This is a character list of the 2017 Ultra Series Ultraman Geed.

Nebula House
The  is a Sturm spaceship that originally belonged to Kei and buried 500 meters beneath the astronomical observatory, serving as a home and base to Riku who becomes its current owner and named it the  after his former residential area.

Riku Asakura/Ultraman Geed
 is the 19-year old protagonist of the series. A teenager with no knowledge of his past, he was found nearby the astronomical observatory as a baby and lived a normal life until his home and workplace were destroyed by Skull Gomora. Riku stumbles into the Nebula House while considering spending the night at the observatory where he learns of his true nature as an Ultraman. In the series finale, he finally face against his father in a battle that puts the fate of the universe at stake. The assistance from Ultraman King allows him to bring forth copies of his Fusion Rise forms as reinforcements. Once both are in their original forms, Geed and Belial fought to a standstill before trying to understand the pain and suffering that his father endured ever since being banished from the Land of Light. Unfortunately as Belial was beyond all help, Geed puts him to rest with his finisher. In the aftermath of the battle, Geed is finally recognized as the public hero as Riku resumed his normal life.

Being an Ultra Warrior in disguise, Riku possesses Belial's  that allows him to perform multiple inhuman feats.

His original form is in fact an exact copy of his father's Early Style, save for its Color Timer. This forms is usually glimpsed during his Fusion Rise and is also shown at the series finale.
: Geed's default form based on Ultraman and Ultraman Belial. Despite being balanced in terms of performances, he is capable of exerting the full potential of his inner strength should he consumed by his own rage and is able to fight on par with Belial. Although presented as a berserker-type fighter like his father, Geed retains the original Ultraman's heart of justice.
: Geed's strength form based on Ultraseven and Ultraman Leo.
: Geed's speed form based on Ultraman Hikari and Ultraman Cosmos.
: Geed's super form based on Ultraman Zero and Father of Ultra.
: Geed's ultimate Fusion Rise form based on Ultraman King and Ultraman Belial.

In addition, the Data Carddass game Ultraman Fusion Fight! also introduced game-exclusive Fusion Rise. By inserting two Ultra Capsules into the arcade machine, players can utilize the Fusion exclusively in a finisher.
: Based on Ultraman and Shining Ultraman Zero.
: Based on Ultraman Belial and Ultraman Orb Emerium Slugger.
: Based on Ultraman Tiga and Ultraman Zero Luna-Miracle Zero.
: Based on Ultraman Mebius and Ultraman Orb Specium Zeperion.
: Based on Zoffy and Ultraman Mebius.
: Based on Ultraman Leo and Astra.
: Based on Ultraman Dyna and Ultraman Cosmos.
: Based on Ultraman Gaia (V2) and Ultraman Hikari.
: Based on Father of Ultra and Ultraman Belial.
: Based on Ultraman Nexus Junis and Ultimate Zero.

Tatsuomi himself previously portrayed Nao in Ultraman Zero: The Revenge of Belial and mentions watching Ultraman Nexus, Ultraman Max and Ultraman Mebius during his days as a preschool student, at the same time viewing Belial as a father instead of an enemy character.

According to Koichi Sakamoto, Geed's status as a hero who inherited the blood of a villain is comparable to the titular character of Devilman. Riku Asakura's name is based on the late science fiction writer Arthur C. Clarke. His favorite Ultraman is Ultraman Justice from Ultraman Cosmos vs. Ultraman Justice: The Final Battle due to the character's development from antagonist to protagonist.

Pega
 is a child of the Alien Pegassa race that debuted in episode 6 of Ultra Seven. Six years prior to the series, Pega was ordered by his parents to wander across the universe and return to their home planet once he grow. One day, his transportation capsule broke and was left stranded on Earth until a young Riku offered a shelter to him, thus marking the start of his friendship. Despite his cowardly appearance, Pega always wishes to help Geed in any way he can and sells handmade paper flowers to keep Riku afloat.

When wandering outside, Pega uses his kind's  ability to hide within Riku's shadow. He is also a talented genius and is proficient in Spanish.

He is named after Alien Pega from episode 36 of Ultra Seven.

Laiha Toba
 is a 19-year-old girl with a mastery of swordsmanship who has never missed a single day of training, revealed to originally hosted a Little Star since birth when Ultraman King answered her parents' prayers to be born without complications. While the Little Star manifested when Laiha was 13 years old, it became dormant in the aftermath of her parents' death on Mt. Mitsuse by Kei Fukuide as Skull Gomora. Laiha vowed to find her parents' murderer and avenge them. In the present day, she met Riku while rescuing Eri from a Dada, witnessing his transformation into Geed and given board in the Nebula House in return for her intel about the Little Stars. Sometime prior to the arrival of Ultraman Belial, Laiha's Little Star powers resurface, allowing her to hear King's voice when he pleaded her not to kill Kei and later warning her of Belial's arrival. Upon learning of her powers, and her feelings for Riku, Laiha saved him while transferring her Little Star into Riku in the form of King Capsule.

According to director Sakamoto, the choice of employing Chihiro as a female protagonist is due to his fondness of women with combat capabilities.

RE.M.
 is the Nebula House's , revealed to be an operation system created by Kei and named after the Sturm word for "servant." By the time RE.M. was found by Riku, her memory of Kei deleted, she designated the youth the new owner as he coincidentally named her after a heroine from Donshine. While RE.M provides Riku with his arsenal, she reveals that much of her access like sensitive data like that on the Little Stars is blocked. Overtime, RE.M. gradually becomes more human-like prior to Kei forcefully taking back the Nebula House and deleting her when she sent Riku to safety. Though RE.M. survives by transferring herself to an android body, Kei capitalizes by restoring her original programing to force her to fight Geed when piloting Mecha Gomora. But RE.M. manages to purge herself of her base programming, retaking the Nebula House from Kei while gaining full access to all the data he previously locked.

RE.M. primarily interacts with others through spherical devices called , which can track and fire laser beams.

The U-Toms are a tribute to the similarly named robot from episode 17 of Ultra Seven.

AIB
The Alien Investigation Bureau, abbreviated as AIB, is a secret investigation team that deals with evil aliens. The foundation of this group is a result of the Crisis Impact, formed by aliens of multiple races in hopes of restoring the order Belial destroyed. The appearance of Ultraman Geed had caused mixed receptions among their members, with several few believed him as a threat. In aftermath of Belial's death, the AIB begin a secondary mission to gather the scattered Monster Capsules and prevent them from falling into wrong hands.

Moa Aizaki
 is Riku's childhood friend, also liked watching Donshine as a child. Aged 25 years old in the series, her family was the one who found Riku at the observatory and took care of him ever since then before he is able to live on his own. Her membership in AIB begins when she was tendering an exhausted alien of the Zelan race, causing Zena to take interest from her bravery and took Moa under his wing as his partner. Though she tends to mess up, Zena considers Moa a vital member in the AIB.

Zena
As his people are unable to emote, Zena's mouth does not move while in disguise. Although he hid Zegun in hopes of using the monster to counter Belial if he returns, preferring to destroy the control device and leave the monster stranded in another dimension, the infiltration by his student Kuruto made use of Zegun impossible. With his student beyond reasoning, Zena was forced to beg Geed and Zero to end Kuruto's life.

Zegun
: A monster created as the Shadow race's living weapon, its  capable of sending its targets to different places. Although not fatal to the monster, using Zegun when its controller in an exhausted state would cost them their own life. When Zena joined the AIB, he kept Zegun's bracelet, initially wanting to dispose before keeping it in case of Belial's return. After Kuruto infiltrate the group and stole it, he decided to use Zegun to invade Earth and restore the glory of Planet Shadow. In its second fight with Geed and Zero, Kuruto had Zegun destroy itself after it was sealed in a containment barrier made by the two Ultras. Zena later restored Zegun to aid Geed in the final battle against Belial. While Zegun helped Geed create a portal to the void to trap Belial, the monster is destroyed by the evil Ultraman.

Other members
: An alien scientist of the all-female Pitt race who hosted the Little Star of Ultraman Hikari, granting her the ability to create an energy sword. Tri was originally part of a Pitt invasion force but defected and by hiding an Eleking they were to use on Earth before making a new life on the planet. When the Little Star in her body awakened Eleking, Tri desperately used herself as bait to lure the monster out from the city, breaking the speed limit and steals Riku's bike along the way while attracting the AIB's attention. Tri manages to convince the AIB that she is not like her kin, later being recruited by the organization and working on Earth under the human identity of  after her Little Star was harvested by Geed. While stationed to investigate and protect Little Star hosts, she was attacked by Godo Wynn, who attempted to kidnap the hosts before Laiha's intervention.
: A teenage humanoid alien whose race possesses the power to read the minds of others, skills used by the AIB to deal with monsters to find out their intent. While on Earth to help with a Zandrias, assuming the alias , Nabia expresses initial disappointment in humans being dishonest (something that her race lacked due to being mind readers) before eventually understanding it a bit after achieving her mission with the Ultra Warriors' and Moa's help.
: One of the aliens in command center who spies on Kei Fukuide. First appeared in episode 13 and 14 of Ultra Seven.
: One of the aliens in command center who spies on Kei Fukuide. First appeared in episode 39 of Ultraman Mebius.
: One of the aliens in command center who spies on Kei Fukuide. He is a tribute to Grozam from episodes 43-46 of Ultraman Mebius.
: One of the aliens who spies on Kei before succumbing to his surprise attack. First appeared in episode 31 of Return of Ultraman.
: One of the aliens who spies on Kei before succumbing to his surprise attack.
: A female alien who was among the operatives that spied Kei. During his surprise attack, she try to get his editor to safety before being attacked by his cane. First appeared in episode 25 of Ultraman Max.
: A female alien  who operates the command center with Zena.
Alien Pegassa : An adult Alien Pegassa who appeared in the second and third episode of Ultraman Chronicle Zero & Geed. He is an AIB agent sent to monitor Riku and Pega in the Beyond School and was mistaken as the latter by the young Ultra in disguise. Although prefers conversing in the Pegassa's native language, he understands Japanese words. He was originally mentioned in episode 24 of Ultraman New Generation Chronicle when Booska mistook an AIB enrollment letter meant for Pega. He is voiced by Megumi Han, who is also Pega's voice actress.

Igaguri Family

Leito Igaguri

Rumina Igaguri
 is Leito's 28 year old wife. She later knows her hushand's identity as Ultraman Zero on episode 24 due to his bad at lying whenever he has something else to do.

Mayu Igaguri
 is Leito's 5-year-old daughter who is later revealed to be the host of Zero's Little Star, enabling her to teleport. Her power was transferred to Geed in the form of Zero Capsule when pleading him to save Laiha.

Other Ultra Warriors
As a result of Belial and Kei's actions in the Childhood Radiation, the powers of Ultra Warriors were scattered around the Earth and inhabited their hosts as Little Stars.

Ultraman Zero

Inter-Galactic Defense Force
The  is an organization in the Land of Light. Several members were shown fighting against Belial before he commences . Six years after that, the Ultra Warriors were regarded as a myth to the humanity with memories of Crisis Impact were assumed to be meteorite showers.
: The Executive Leader of Inter-Galactic Defense Force, originally known as Ultraman Ken and a former comrade of Belial prior to his descent into evil. Father later appears to aid Geed and the others against Belial in the final battle by preserving the latter in a containment barrier long enough for Geed to escape before the former recuperated and rejoined the battle.
: The Silver Cross Aid Commander, originally known as Ultrawoman Marie.
: A division of 11 Ultras. Alongside untold numbers of Inter-Galactic Defense Force members, they fought against Ultraman Belial and were caught in the Crisis Impact explosion.
: See here.
: His power inhabited a Gubila, allowing the monster to emit paralyzing sparks from its Die Hard Drill. It was harvested by Geed into  out of Gubila's gratitude towards the Ultra.
: See here.
: See here.
: His power inhabited Fujio Manga, allowing him to use the Ultra's Vertical Guillotine.
: See here
: An Ultraman from Nebula L77 in the Leo constellation who assumed the guise of  while protecting Earth, also being Zero's teacher during the former's exile from Land of Light. Following the Crisis Impact, Leo's power became a Little Star that inhabited Eri Hara before it transferred into Geed.
: Leo's brother.

: See here.
: A scientist who was previously a member of the Space Science Technology Bureau. Prior to the Crisis Impact, Hikari created the Risers and Ultra Capsules for the fight against Ultraman Belial before they were stolen sometime after the universe was restored. Following the Crisis Impact, Hikari's power became a Little Star that inhabited Tri Tip before it transferred into Geed and created . When Zero was fighting a Galactron, Hikari sent him a Riser and a set of New Generation Capsules.

Showa Ultras
: A legendary figure of the Land of Light, having lived for 300,000 years as the most powerful of the Ultramen due to his godly power. King appears in the midst of Crisis Impact, restoring the universe after Belial destroyed it by merging his entire being into it. As a result, King's essence is too scattered for him to be reached by the others. Laiha was his Little Star host, who develop this symptom when he saved her during her birth and as a result developing Little Star symptoms earlier before Kei instigated the Childhood Radiation. Aside from guiding Laiha, King as well provide her his help to reach Riku and save him from Chimeraberus. After claiming the Sturm Organ from Kei, Belial absorbed King's essence to further strengthen himself and simultaneously endangering both the universe and King's own life until Zero delivers a specialized enzyme to Belial's timer, therefore reversing the process. King aids Geed in the final battle by materializing his other forms. Using the King Capsule again, Riku restored King's original body as he thanked the boy and departed from Earth. He is voiced by Nobuyuki Hiyama, who also voices the Risers.

Heisei Ultras
: Though never appeared, his Little Star hosted within Moko and was salvaged by Geed while fighting against Arstron, allowing him to obtain  as part of his new form Acro Smasher.
: In the height of Galactron's attack, Hikari presented Leito/Zero with the third Riser and Capsules of succeeding Ultra Warriors. This allows the Ultra to assume Ultraman Zero Beyond and turn the tides of the battle.

In the event of Gillvalis' assault on Earth, Gai approached Riku and providing advise to the young boy as an Ultra Warrior.

Supporting Heroes
: The team of giant heroes founded by Ultraman Zero in aftermath of the destruction of Belial Galactic Empire. Alongside Zero, their characters were portrayed as villains in Kei's Cosmo Chronicle.

Antagonists

Ultraman Belial

Kei Fukuide
 is the main antagonist of the series, an alien of the war-torn race known as the  who found purpose when recruited by Ultraman Belial during the end days of Planet Sturm. Having become fanatically devoted to Belial, Kei acted his master's wishes by creating Riku and using Riser technology he stole from Planet Ultra to develop the Monster Capsules. When the AIB caught on to his true nature, vexed in Geed not making it easy, Kei is forced to steal the Ultra Capsules in Riku's possession. But Kei loses the Zero Capsule, forced by Belial to absorb the other six Ultra Capsules' energy which causes him to briefly lose his mind in a berserker rampage before being defeated by Geed Magnificent. After Belial's death, bent on making Riku suffer for his actions while using the Nebula House's resources to heal his Sturm Organ, Kei resolved to inherit the former's legacy and used nonfiction writer Arie Ishikari to acquire the Alien Empera and Dark Lugiel Capsules for his ideal final chapter. But following his final battle with Geed in Okinawa, learning that Belial survived and observed him through Arie, Kei loses his Sturm Organ and forsaken despite his expression of being an integral part in his master's plan and resolves to continue aiding Belial until he drew his last breath during the final battle.

While posing as a polite gentleman, Kei unveils a cruel and ruthless side when engaging in a battle. As a Sturm, Kei possesses his race's , which polarizes energies absorbed into his body, allowing him to create negation barriers and fire shockwave projectiles from his hand. Because of said organ, Kei had been storing energies from his battle with Geed and Zero under the purpose to strengthen himself but lost it when Belial tear the organ from his body to revive himself, leaving Kei with several days to live. By loading a single Monster Capsule to the Riser, he can summon a single monster based on it. The Belial Fusion Monster will forcefully disappear should their Monster Capsules overheated, forcing Kei to use another set or wait for the original to cool down.
This monster first appeared targeting a young Laiha by killing her parents in Mt. Mitsuse and harvest her Little Star. Six years later, it rampaged on Hoshiyama, targeting Eri's Little Star before being subjected to Geed's Wrecking Burst, allowing Riku to claim Leo Capsule based on Kei's anticipation.
: Accessed with the use of Eleking and Ace Killer Capsules, its finisher being . In its initial appearance, Kei used Thunder Killer as an attempt to strengthen Geed, allowing the latter to obtain Geed Claw. He used it again and fought alongside a summoned Zaigorg until he was defeated by Geed Royal Mega-Master.
: Accessed with the use of Zetton and King Joe Capsules, its finisher being . It was first used to fight against Ultraman Geed to claim all his Capsules after putting their battle into a stalemate. When Belial forced him to absorb its power, Kei plunged it to his chest and rampaged across the city as Pedanium Zetton under the state of insanity before being defeated by Geed. Sometime later, Pedanium Zetton was utilized to hunt Gubila (a Little Star host) across the city and used his knowledge of Geed's Royal Mega-Master to overpower said Ultra before Gubila paralyzed him long enough for Geed to counterattack.
: Having empowering his Sturm Organ with the light of Planet Sturm, Kei transforms into a variation of Pedanium Zetton,  signified by the greenish energy emission from his Sturm Organ. This was further enhanced when he shoved the Monster Capsules of Alien Empera and Dark Lugiel, growing into a towering monster before Geed defeated him for good. While growing gigantic, Pedanium Zetton Evolved can charge his fist with Sturm energy to perform .
Although an original character in Ultraman Fusion Fight! Capsule Yugo, this fusion made its appearance in the Ultraman Festival 2017 and assumed by Ultraman Belial. King Galactron's appearance in the series was used by Kei Fukuide in against Geed and Zero while Arie tried to claim the capsules of Alien Empera and Dark Lugiel.

In addition, the Data Carddass game Ultraman Fusion Fight! also introduced game-exclusive Fusion Rise. By inserting two Monster Capsules into the arcade machine, players can utilize the Fusion exclusively in a finisher.

Monster Capsules
 are items created by Kei through infusing Hikari's Ultra Capsules and the essence of Ultra Monsters. These capsules allow them to utilize its power as a Belial Fusion Monsters or summon respective monsters into the battle. Even when not in use, a single capsule can still harm the surrounding environment with its presence. Belial's collection of capsules scattered across the city upon Chimeraberus' destruction, forcing AIB to collect them as possible before they could be used by other evil factions.

Summoned Capsules
One single model was first shown fighting against Geed before it escaped from Zero's intervention. Three Darklops Zero were summoned by Kei through the use of three  before they were destroyed by Geed Solid Burning.
: A giant war robot of unknown origin that first appeared in episodes 14 and 15 of Ultraman Orb, having attack numerous dimension. Kei possesses two , using one in his plan to hold his audience hostage to force Zero to take the blow from its heat ray, successfully killing him before shutting down to give Geed a reprieve. It reactivated in the next day under Kei's orders to resume it fight with Geed as he summoned a second Galactron to fight against a revived Zero before both units were destroyed by Geed Acro Smasher and Zero Beyond. Galactron's main weapons are  capture claw and  sword.
Its main weapon is a huge kanabō on its right arm and launches  from its chest. Kei used it to fend himself against the Dada-piloted Legionoid before joining Thunder Killer in against Ultraman Geed, defeated by Royal Mega-Master's Lance Spark.
After exiting Mecha Gomora and banishing Kei out from the Nebula House, RE.M. exposed the robot's main weakness on its neck, allowing Geed Royal Mega-Master to destroy it via Spacium Flasher. First appeared in Ultra Galaxy Legend Side Story: Ultraman Zero vs. Darklops Zero.
: A monster with the ability to regenerate, Starbem Gyeron was a monster who first appeared in episode 26 of Ultraseven. By the sixth day of its appearance, once the group formulating a plan to negate its regeneration, Geed destroys Starbem Gyeron while Zero creates a barrier to lessen the distance of the remains. The remains are then gathered and frozen by the Hoshiyama residents as AIB scattered the frozen fragments across the universe.

Other Capsules
It was used alongside Red King Capsule to form Skull Gomora.
It was used in unison with Gomora Capsule to form Skull Gomora.
It was used in unison with Eleking Capsule to form Thunder Killer
It was used in unison with Zetton Capsule to form Pedanium Zetton or Galactron Capsule to form King Galactron.
It was used in unison with King Joe Capsule to form Pedanium Zetton.
It was retrieved by the AIB in the aftermath of Belial's demise and secured in their vault until Kei took it for his endgame. Kei used both of them to enlarge Pedanium Zetton before Belial did the same as Atrocious.
The Dark Lugiel Capsule was retrieved by AIB in the aftermath of Belial's demise, stored away in their vault for safe keeping until Kei took it for his endgame. Kei briefly used them to enlarge Pedanium Zetton before Belial did the same as Atrocious.

Arie Ishikari

Gillvalis
 is the main antagonist of Ultraman Geed The Movie, originally a sentient artificial intelligence called  created by Kushia scientists for universal peace. But Gillvalis' programing causes him to reach the conclusion that all other forms of intelligent life in the universe must be exterminated.

Aside from the ability to reflect all attacks from Ultra Warriors, Gillvalis is also capable of digitizing an entire planet. Gillvalis is later installed into a Galactron-type body called  is armed with the built-in  cannons. Gillvalis' main attacks are the  ray, the  energy bullet, the  barrier, and  headbutt. His strongest attack is the  volley from all the cannons including the  cannon arms.

Galactron MK2
 is an enhanced version of Galactron in Ultraman Geed the Movie. It was sent to Earth per Gillvalis' own orders to capture the Red Steel and faced against Geed before retreating. When both Nebula House and AIB went to Okinawa, Galactron MK2 made itself known and faced oppositions in the form of Geed, Orb, Zero and Gukuru Shisa. The robot vanguard easily resisted all of their attacks and digitized Geed into a cyberspace before being rescued by Orb. As a result of Zero and Orb's "sacrifice" to shield Geed from incoming attack, the young Ultra quickly destroyed Galactron MK2 after falling into a berserk rage.

Galactron MK2's main weapons are the  battle axe,  machine guns,  beam guns, and  blades. It is also capable of creating the  barriers from the  generators and firing the  capture beams.

Valis Raiders
The  are human-sized robot soldiers that are sent by Gillvalis to wipe out all remaining survivors after the Galactron Army attacked the world.

Little Star
 is an energy substance formed after the  released by Ultraman King glued to the body of life forms through Kei's . His purpose of doing so is to activate the powers of Ultra Capsules and resurrect Belial to his physical form. Since Little Stars can attract monsters, Geed's part as a savior would be crucial to obtain its power. The AIB as well took intervention into this case by developing an enzyme that would dissolve the Carellen Element as alternatives to cure the Little Star symptoms.

Upon activation of a Little Star, the host would develop symptoms of hand fever and radiation lights emerged from their body, followed by the development of an Ultra Warrior's power. The only way to separate them is for their hosts to pray upon the Ultra Warriors.

: Yoshiko's daughter and Haruo's niece. She hosted the Little Star of Ultraman Leo, granting her pyrokinesis. After being targeted by both Dada and Skull Gomora, Eri's prayer for Ultraman Geed separated the Little Star for Riku to claim it as Leo Capsule.
: A host of the Little Star of Ultraseven, granting him the armor of light for offense and defense. When Toru cheered Geed on, the Little Star separated from the boy for Riku to claim it as Seven Capsule.
Alien Pitt "Tri Tip" (see above)
: A small space monster that was adopted by street comedian named Takashi Arai, who gave it the name . Moko is also a host of the Little Star of Ultraman Cosmos, granting it the ability to heal others which Takashi exploited for money. After being saved by its owner when Moa attempted to confiscate it, Moko's Little Star was salvaged by Geed as Cosmos Capsule and Moko was allowed to remain with Takashi after it proved too difficult for the AIB to contain.
Mayu Igaguri: (see above)
Laiha Toba: (see above)
: A retired local administrator who named Riku when he was discovered as a baby. He was had hope to adopt the boy until his wife's death in an accident, forcing him to surrender Riku to the Aizaki family. Three months prior, Sui developed the symptoms of Father of Ultra's Little Star, allowing him to perceive Riku and the current events surrounding him. With months left to live due to an incurable disease, he invited Riku to his house where he told the boy of their history. When Pedanium Zetton try to attack him, his prayer for Riku to live on allowed the boy to gain Father of Ultra's capsule and use it with Zero Capsule into Ultraman Geed Magnificent. In aftermath, Riku decided to visit him again until his illness cured.
: A host of the Little Star of Ultraman Jack, allowing her to perform the Ultra's . As a result of her gratitude for Geed, Jack's Ultra Capsule is harvested by the Ultra.
: A host of the Little Star of Ultraman Ace, allowing him to perform the Ultra's . As a result of his gratitude for Geed, Ace's Ultra Capsule is harvested by the Ultra.
: A host of the Little Star of Ultraman Taro, providing him with pyrokinesis. As a result of his gratitude for Geed, Taro's Ultra Capsule is harvested by the Ultra.
: A fish-like monster that hosted the Little Star of Zoffy, which possesses the ability to emit paralyzing sparks from its  nose. Due to its nature, Gubila was targeted by Kei/Pedanium Zetton before Geed interfered, giving the Ultra an opening to defeat said monster. After the battle, Gubila relinquished the Little Star to Geed (turned into Zoffy Capsule) in gratitude for his rescue. First appeared in episode 24 of Ultraman.

Other characters
Major
After both his shop and Riku's home were destroyed by Skull Gomora, Haruo decided to stay at Yoshiko's house for a while and restarted his business under a minivan.
: Kei's 33-year-old editor in his novels, he was revealed to be cooperating with the AIB to uncover his secret. After Kei foiled their attempts, Jōji was killed sometime later prior to Pedanium Zetton's appearance. The discovery of his corpse led to the downfall of Kei's popularity on Earth as he is on the run from authorities.

Minor
: The eponymous protagonist of show within a show tokusatsu series . His catchphrase "Here We Go!" is used by Riku during his Fusion Rise and is one of his inspiration to become a hero. He is voiced by former Voyager member .
: The main antagonist of Blasting Chronicler Donshine.
: Haruo's younger sister.
: A struggling comedian who has been multiple times ditched by his partners. After finding Moco, Takashi adopted and took advantage of the animal's Little Star but shows genuine friendship while saving Moco from Arstron. Although it lost the Little Star to Geed, Takashi restarted his comedian career with Moco as his partner.
 and : Laiha's parents who were killed by Skull Gomora six years ago.

Other monsters and aliens

Good
: A Pterasaur-like monster whose kind is first seen in episode 4 of Ultraman 80. A young Zandrias male came to Earth out of depression from his own mate, unable to physically leave the planet while throwing temper tantrums. Once Nabia found out the Zandrias' personal problem, Moa encouraged the monster not to give up on love while Zero knocks him back into space to be reunited with his mate.
: An ancient race that was wiped out by Gillvalis. In the past, they were revealed to be the true creator of Giga Battle Nizer, the same weapon that Belial used in his conquest for power.
: The 33,000-year-old last surviving member of the Kushia People named  who posed as a tour guide of Okinawa Prefecture. She enlisted the help of Ultraman Geed to overcome a new threat.
: Airu's late father and a scientist who created the Giga Finalizer. When driven into a corner by a number of Galactrons, he sacrificed himself to save his daughter and creation.
: The former antagonist from Ultraman Orb, who had since reformed. He provided Riku with the guidance of "red steel" in Okinawa.
: A shisa-like ancient guardian monster of Okinawa. Gukuru Shisa protects the "red steel" in the form of a stone statue.

Evil
: Dadaism-themed aliens from the Planet Dada who identify themselves with digit numbers, the race having first appeared in episode 28 of Ultraman. The Dada race are among the victims of Belial's evil regiment that was once reigned the universe.
While hiding after his failure, Dada was killed for his interference by Kei.
116 (18): A Dada arrives to Earth after Belial's demise, planning to take over the universe in his place and going after an amnesiac Kei to avenge his comrades in a hijacked Legionoid. Though Zero intercepted him on the first attempt, the Dada finds Kei and ends up being killed when he caused Kei to regain his memories and summoned Zaigorg to destroy the Legionoid.
Dada 116 brought the Legionoid to Earth to hunt down an amnesiac Kei, only for its second attempt to accidentally restore Kei's memories as he summons Zaigorg to destroy the robot alongside its pilot.
: An alien from the Planet Huk whose kind first appeared in episode 47 of Ultra Seven. Moa would use the Lugus later on to sedate Eleking long enough for Geed to counterattack.
: A sniper belong to a race of superior-minded genocidal maniacs whose kind first terrorized Earth in episode 19 of Ultra Seven. Pega manages to distract the Bado long enough for Laiha to reach his location and fight him, the Bado attempting to snipe Geed before being crushed by incoming debris during his fight against Pedanium Zetton.
: An alien who illegally stayed on Earth, not wanting to get out before being apprehended by both Moa and Kuruto.
: A race of notorious invaders whose infamous for the use of guerrilla tactic. Their invasion on other planets stem from the need for their race to survive. As a result of their conflict with Belial, their original planet became inhabitable and the rest of their kin scattered across the space. First appeared in episode 23 of Ultra Seven.
: The last surviving Gabra Cano and Zena's final student. After retrieving Zegun, Kuruto tries to invade Earth in hopes of restoring Planet Shadow's glory, despising his former teacher for joining AIB instead. Although Zena offered his life as an exchange while others try to reason with him, Kuruto saw himself beyond redemption and orchestrate his death by allowing Zegun to be contained by the Ultramen and had Zegun continue its attack before he is consumed in the resulting explosion.
Their main goal is to exploit the powers of Little Stars as part of their military strength and to restore the glory of their planet. While Godo deals with the Little Stars, another operative tried to sneak attack on Zena before the latter turn the tables. He was deported away by Zena after Chimeraberus' departure.
: A Godola who slipped into AIB, posing as a fellow scientist that assisted Tri Tip in studying the Little Stars. Upon showing his true color, Godo try to take an injured Tri and other Little Stars (including Laiha) with him before he was overwhelmed by Laiha. While growing large and fighting against Geed, Godo was killed by the newly arrived Belial.
: An information broker who relays the news of Alien Empera and Dark Lugiel Capsules to Kei Fukuide. He is voiced by Kenta Matsumoto and first appeared in episode 26 of Ultra Q: Dark Fantasy.
: An alien whose responsible for transforming Belial into his current state. He was mentioned in a flashback during Geed and Belial's final battle as Riku tapped into Belial's previous memories.
: A group of five aliens assembled by Belial during his conquest. Within Belial's flashback, they were only shown alongside Kei as Belial prepared for his fight against the Ultra Warriors.
: The main antagonist of Ultra Fight Orb. Although the original story featured his death by Geed, Riku's discovery of Belial's memory retcons the event with his father as Reibatos' true murderer.
: An information broker who is based in the bar  located in the town.
: First appeared in Ultraman Orb The Movie. 

: First appeared in episode 37 of Return of Ultraman.
: First appeared in episode 8 of Ultraseven X.
Darkness Alien Alien Shaplay
Alien Doble

Space Emperor Alien Bado
: First appeared in episode 19 of Ultra Q.
Electric Wave Phantom Lecuum

Insect Alien Alien Ckalutch

Neutral
: A monster that was shown in the Pre-Premier special as a demonstration for Geed's Acro Smasher form. First appeared in episode 22 of Ultraman.
: An electric-eel-like reptilian native to Planet Pitt that is used as a biological weapon by the Pitt race, having first appeared in episode 3 of Ultra Seven. Like many of its species, Eleking was intended by a Pitt invasion force to attack Earth. But Tri Tip, having grown to love Earth, spirited the infant Eleking to the planet and hid it away. But the fully matured Eleking is later revived by the Little Star in Tri Tip's body, instinctively pursuing her for the energy.
: A species of aquatic monster native to Planet Valky, originally kept as pets due to their adorable appearance until they were abandoned out of fear being monster weapons. Zena and Moa managed to find an abandoned baby Samekujira before it ended up in the wrong hands. First appeared in episode 53 of Ultraman Taro.
: A monster on that appeared in wake of Moco's Little Star to track its source, Geed using his powers in Acro Smasher form to pacify Arstron and convince it to leave peacefully. First appeared in episode 1 of Return of Ultraman.
: Mentioned only by RE.M., the race's disguise badge  was replicated by her for Riku to use while disguising as Leito, which also allows Pega to conceal his appearance without the need of Dark Zone. First appeared in episode 20 of Ultra Seven.
: A monster that attempted to dig the Nebula House for Mayu's Little Star. It was quickly defeated by Ultraman Zero Beyond's Wide Beyond Shot. First appeared in episode 40 of Ultraman Taro.
Space Phantom Alien Zelan (15): Another Zelan (different from the AIB operative) was shown in Moa's past, who was tended by her after being exhausted.

Notes

References
Published materials

Sources

External links
Official website for the cast list of Ultraman Geed
Official website for the cast list of Ultraman Geed the Movie

, Ultraman Geed
Geed